Adaptogens or adaptogenic substances are used in herbal medicine for the claimed stabilization of physiological processes and promotion of homeostasis.

History
The concept of adaptogens was originally created in 1947 to describe a substance that may increase resistance to stress. The term "adaptogenesis" was later applied in the Soviet Union to describe remedies thought to increase the resistance of organisms to biological stress. Most of the studies conducted on adaptogens were performed in the Soviet Union, Korea, and China before the 1980s. The term was not accepted in pharmacological, physiological, or mainstream clinical practices in the European Union.

References 

Herbalism
Pharmaceutics